Allan Mason is an American record producer and A&R executive.

Music career 
Mason was the vice president in charge of A&R when GRT Records assumed sole ownership of Janus Records in 1971, after Pye Records pulled out of the venture.

Mason, along with Stuart Love at Warner Brothers, Matthew Kaufman at A&M, John Cale, and Kim Fowley provided the initial money for a demo for Jonathan Richman's band The Modern Lovers.

Filmography 
Mason was the music consultant for Father of the Bride and an executive music producer for Bandits.  He is known for his long-standing film collaborations with Barry Levinson, acting as music consultant and supervisor on the Levinson films Good Morning, Vietnam and Rain Man, among others.

Personal life 
Mason attended University of Maryland, College Park. Currently, he resides in Los Angeles, California.

References

External links 
 

A&R people
Living people
People from Baltimore
People from Los Angeles
American music industry executives
American music managers
University of Maryland, College Park alumni
Year of birth missing (living people)